Campiglossa taenipennis is a species of tephritid or fruit flies in the genus Campiglossa of the family Tephritidae.

Distribution
The species is found in Peru.

References

Tephritinae
Insects described in 1941
Diptera of South America